Jacob Henry Miller was a lawyer from the U.S. State of Ohio who served as President of the Ohio State Senate.

Biography
Jacob Henry Miller was born October 3, 1865 in Licking County, Ohio. He graduated from Bethany College in West Virginia with A.B., and from Ohio Northern University Pettit College of Law with L.L.B.

Miller was elected to the Ohio State Senate 1917–1918, and served as President of the Senate. He was a member of Delta Tau Delta, and supported women's suffrage and prohibition.

References

1865 births
1920 deaths
Claude W. Pettit College of Law alumni
Bethany College (West Virginia) alumni
Ohio lawyers
People from Licking County, Ohio
Presidents of the Ohio State Senate
Democratic Party Ohio state senators
Burials at Cedar Hill Cemetery, Newark, Ohio
19th-century American lawyers